Precision Air serves, or has served, the following locations:

References

Precision Air